Rubber Johnny is a 2005 British experimental short film/music video written, directed, and produced by Chris Cunningham.

Plot
The film, entirely presented in infrared vision, begins with an out-of-focus closeup of Johnny (played by Cunningham) babbling incomprehensibly while being interviewed by an unseen man. At one point, Johnny mumbles the word "ma-ma" twice, after which the man asks if he wants his mother to come in. This causes Johnny to start breathing erratically and lose control, so the man gives Johnny a sedative injection to calm him down.

The video cuts to a fluorescent light turning on, a mouse crawling over a press-sticker credits list, followed by the title, "Rubber Johnny", which is shown written on a condom in a backwards-playing shot of it being pulled off a penis.

Johnny sits recumbent in his wheelchair with his oversized head hanging over the back of it. He starts dancing to the Aphex Twin track "Afx237 v.7" while his chihuahua watches. His dancing involves him performing balancing tricks with his wheelchair and deflecting light beams with his hands. A door opens and Johnny is interrupted by an aggressive male voice. During this, Johnny is sitting upright in the wheelchair. The voice yells at him indistinctly, a slap to Johnny's face is implied, and the door is slammed shut.

Johnny snorts a large line of cocaine. He screams in the dark and then hides behind a door, avoiding white light beams. Johnny's face smashes repeatedly into a glass surface, and each time chunks of his face articulate the vocals in the song. He is interrupted a second time by the voice, after which Johnny once again reclines back in his wheelchair and babbles at his chihuahua.

The credits roll over a night scene of a train passing in the distance.

Production
Shot on DV night-vision, the film was made in Cunningham's own time as a home movie of sorts, and took three and half years of weekends to complete.

Cunningham explained that the effect of an exploding head was made using "just a tangerine and Plasticine with a banger inside it". He created some effects in his own kitchen instead of relying on CGI.

Release

Home media
Rubber Johnny was released on DVD by Warp on 20 June and 12 July 2005. The latter release included a book on the film containing 40-odd pages.

Reception

Pascal Wyse of The Guardian referred to it as "virtuosic grossness", stating, "there is more fleeting shock than real haunting. Perhaps, in all the synaptic mayhem, there is just no room for the viewer to contact their own demons." Treble.com listed the film in its "10 Terrifying Music Videos", calling it "both hilarious and terrifying".

Writing for The Telegraph, Chris Campion asserted that the video was "like a Looney Tunes short for a generation raised on video nasties and rave music".

S. McKeating of Stylus Magazine awarded Rubber Johnny a 'B+' rating, lauding it as an "exceptionally entertaining odd short film" but only for viewers "with the right frame of mind". He additionally demanded that Cunningham "take it one step further and give us an hour and a half of warped material".

References

External links
 Original commercial at drukqs.net
 
  Archived on 18 November 2022
 
 

2005 films
2005 short films
2005 horror films
2000s avant-garde and experimental films
British body horror films
British avant-garde and experimental films
British horror short films
Music videos directed by Chris Cunningham
2000s English-language films
Films about cocaine
Films about dogs
Music videos
2000s music videos
2000s British films